Alex Bretherton (born 5 December 1982) is an English former professional rugby league footballer who played in the 2000s and 2010s.

He played for the Dewsbury Rams and the Batley Bulldogs in the Championship.

On 9 September 2019 Bretherton announced his retirement

References

External links

 Sky Sports Profile

1982 births
Living people
Batley Bulldogs players
Dewsbury Rams players
English rugby league players
Rugby league second-rows